The Trou de Fer ("Iron Hole") is a canyon on Reunion Island, off the coast of Madagascar in the Indian Ocean. The canyon has two distinct parts: a large crater, which is fed by six prominent waterfalls, and a narrow slot canyon at its outlet, which constitutes most of the canyon's length. The canyon starts at the waterfall of the Bras Mazerine stream and after some 1.4 - 1.8 km from the left side joins the main Bras de Caverne stream.
This drop is usually dry or has very little water, but between that and the next,  drop, springs feed the river, which drops over this then drops over a final  undercut cliff into the Trou de Fer in a narrow plume of water.

This waterfall is not as high, and has a smaller water flow. It is fed by several other falls streaming off the cliffs above it. Further to the left, at about twice the distance from the first falls to the second, another large stream plunges into the canyon. 
In total, there are at least six waterfalls feeding the canyon. At the base of the canyon, a separate slot canyon, or "The Narrows", begins. The water from the Bras de Caverne waterfall and the waterfall to its left drain into the slot canyon at a 90-degree angle, through a waterfall known informally as the "Washing Machine". The name stems from the mist it generates, which drenches people who stand near the base of the falls.

Many springs flow through the porous volcanic rock of the walls, creating countless waterfalls.

The team of Pascale Lapoule, Laurent Broisin and Pascal Colas were the first to climb/walk the canyon on 19–21 September 1989.

See also
List of waterfalls by height

References

Canyons and gorges of France
Landforms of Réunion
Waterfalls of Réunion
Réunion National Park